Éva Barati (born 27 December 1968 in Üröm) is a retired Hungarian athlete who competed in sprinting events. She represented her country at the 1992 Summer Olympics, as well as four World Indoor Championships. Her best position was the sixth place in the 60 metres at the 1996 European Indoor Championships.

Competition record

Personal bests
Outdoor
100 metres – 11.52 (Budapest 1994)
200 metres – 23.66 (Trento 1994)
Indoor
60 metres – 7.22 (Budapest 1994) NR
200 metres – 24.27 (Budapest 1993)

References

1968 births
Living people
Hungarian female sprinters
Athletes (track and field) at the 1992 Summer Olympics
Sportspeople from Pest County
Olympic athletes of Hungary